Caccia al Re – La narcotici (To Catch a King - The narcotics) is an  Italian television crime series, which follows Daniele Piazza (Gedeon Burkhard) as the head of a narcotics division. It originally aired in six episodes on RAI 1 from January 16 to February 8, 2011 and was followed by a second season entitled Challenge to the sky (Sfida al cielo) in 2015.

The first season of La narcotici (English: Anti-Drug Squad) was produced by Italy's Goodtime srl and the second season was co-produced by Goodtime srl with Germany's Beta production. Created by Leonardo Fasoli (Gomorrah) and written and directed by Michele Soavi, both seasons of Anti-Drug Squad are currently airing on MHz Choice and Amazon Prime, in Italian with English subtitles.

The series follows the investigations of a Rome-based Narcotics team as they tackle drug-trafficking in the Italian capital.

First season - Hunting the King (Caccia al Re)

The drug lord referred to as King in the title is referred to in the series as The Eighth King of Rome. The first seven kings of Rome ruled from 753 BC, when Rome was founded, to 509 BC, when the kingdom was overthrown and Rome became a Republic.

Background

Deputy Police Chief Daniele Piazza (Gedeon Burkhard), aka Lupo, is put in charge of leading the narcotics section, after the former head of Narcotics was arrested for corruption.

Piazza has been working in the anti-Robbery section while living with his daughter Sara (Laura Glavan), 17. The season opens with a flashback showing the death of Piazza's wife in a hit-and-run accident 13 years earlier, when their daughter was 4. The vehicle that killed his wife was being driven by a bank robber (Stefano Dionisi) fleeing the scene of Rome's biggest bank heist. The 35 Billion Lire from that bank heist turns out to have provided the capital for launching the Eighth King of Rome's drug empire.

Thus, from the very beginning, we learn that the Eighth King of Rome is the man who murdered, then, Deputy Inspector Piazza's wife.

Cast & Characters
Deputy Police Chief Piazza's team are
 Inspector Daria Lucente (Raffaella Rea) - She led the investigation that convicted her former boss. She is the second in command of the new built unit, in season 2, after the death of her boss, will be promoted to Deputy Chief and put in charge of the unit
 Deputy Inspector Salvo Sciarpa, aka Conte (Sergio Friscia) - Veteran officer who was a non-corrupt member of old Anti-Drug Squad. He took part in the operation that convicted the former Anti-Drug Squad chief, alongside Inspector Lucente
 Lieutenant Eva Crete, aka Mila (Alina Nedelea) - Bulgarian chemist from the scientific investigation section
 Police Officer Anselmo Rocca, aka Snoopy (Denis Fasolo) - Marksman, he comes from the special intervention team involved in the operation that convicted the former Anti-Drug Squad chief
 Police Officer Paolo Corsi, aka Corsaro (Valentino Campitelli) - He is the technical operator of the team. He's also a champion gamer and the youngest member of the police force at 19

The Eighth King of Rome, aka Ivano Consanti (Stefano Dionisi).

Second season - Challenge to the sky (Sfida al cielo)
It's been about 4 years since the events of the first series.

See also
List of Italian television series

References

External links
 

Italian television series
RAI original programming